Stephens County is a county located in the U.S. state of Texas. As of the 2020 census, its population was 9,101. Its county seat is Breckenridge. The county was created in 1858 and organized in 1876. It was originally named Buchanan County, after U.S. President James Buchanan, but was renamed in 1861 for Alexander H. Stephens, the vice president of the Confederate States of America.

Geography

Major highways
  U.S. Highway 180
  U.S. Highway 183
  State Highway 67

Adjacent counties
 Young County (north)
 Palo Pinto County (east)
 Eastland County (south)
 Shackelford County (west)
 Throckmorton County (northwest)

Demographics

Note: the US Census treats Hispanic/Latino as an ethnic category. This table excludes Latinos from the racial categories and assigns them to a separate category. Hispanics/Latinos can be of any race.

As of the census of 2000,  9,674 people, 3,661 households, and 2,591 families resided in the county.  The population density was 11 people per square mile (4/km2).  The 4,893 housing units averaged 6 per square mile (2/km2).  The racial makeup of the county was 86.89% White, 2.92% Black or African American, 0.35% Native American, 0.29% Asian, 0.02% Pacific Islander, 8.15% from other races, and 1.39% from two or more races.  About 14.66% of the population was Hispanic or Latino of any race.

Of the 3,661 households, 31.20% had children under the age of 18 living with them, 57.30% were married couples living together, 9.90% had a female householder with no husband present, and 29.20% were not families. Around 26.40% of all households were made up of individuals, and 13.70% had someone living alone who was 65 years of age or older.  The average household size was 2.47 and the average family size was 2.96.

In the county, the population was distributed as 24.40% under the age of 18, 9.10% from 18 to 24, 25.60% from 25 to 44, 23.20% from 45 to 64, and 17.70% who were 65 years of age or older.  The median age was 39 years. For every 100 females, there were 103.30 males.  For every 100 females age 18 and over, there were 103.00 males.

The median income for a household in the county was $29,583, and for a family was $35,293. Males had a median income of $26,421 versus $21,280 for females. The per capita income for the county was $15,475.  About 12.60% of families and 15.60% of the population were below the poverty line, including 22.60% of those under age 18 and 10.40% of those age 65 or over.

Communities
 Breckenridge (county seat)
 Caddo
 La Casa

Notable people
 Jack Cox, businessman and politician
 Rupert N. Richardson, historian and president of Hardin-Simmons University

Politics
Stephens County is a powerfully Republican county. In 2016, the Democrat for president, Hillary Clinton, received just 10% of the county's vote. The last Democrat to win the county in a presidential election was southerner Jimmy Carter, and the last Democrat to receive over 1,000 votes in the county was southerner Bill Clinton. The Democrat who has come closest to 1,000 votes since then is southerner Al Gore, who got 811 votes.

See also

 National Register of Historic Places listings in Stephens County, Texas
 Recorded Texas Historic Landmark in Stephens County

References

External links

 
 
 Stephens County government's website

 
1876 establishments in Texas
Populated places established in 1876